Fear of Clowns is a 2004 horror film written and directed by Kevin Kangas. The film centres on an artist who is struggling with a hostile spouse and becomes the object of a mentally disturbed clown. It was followed by a 2007 sequel entitled Fear of Clowns 2.

Plot 

Lynn Blodgett, an artist with coulrophobia, has a nightmare in which she is a young girl and encounters a clown with a decomposing face after a car crash at a carnival. Lynn's nightmares have been getting worse since she filed for divorce from her husband, Doctor Bert Tokyo, who hit her upon getting the news, and is fighting for full custody of their son, Nicholas. One night, a shirtless clown ("Shivers") with black eyes and a battle axe gazes at Lynn's house, then walks away. In the morning, Lynn is told that a family living near where she was house sitting was massacred.

At a gallery exhibiting her work, most of which involves monstrous clowns, Lynn meets Tucker Reid, a roller coaster tycoon who purchases one of her paintings for $8000. Tuck invites Lynn to his office, and after the tour, the two are attacked by a mugger, Heston, but escape. Lynn is shaken by the attempted robbery, but brushes off Tuck's offer to stay at her house. Lynn answers a call from the gallery owner and faints after spotting Shivers standing on her patio. The gallery owner then calls the police, who later question Lynn and dismiss her story.

At the gallery, Lynn reluctantly accepts an offer of $20,000 to do a portrait of a man's father, a clown and convicted child molester. Elsewhere, Shivers is tormented by voices, which tell him that he will get better if he continues to terrorize Lynn. Lynn meets with Bert and his lawyer, who state that Bert not only wants custody of Nicholas, but also wants child support, and half the rights and profits to all the paintings that Lynn has created and sold since they married. It is also revealed that Bert has been out of work for six months, and has been lying about being preoccupied with his job.

Shivers stalks Lynn as she is walking with Tuck, and later murders Lynn's friend Amanda. Lynn is contacted by Detective Peters, who tells her about Amanda's death, and that he now believes her story about being scared by a clown, as grease paint was found under Amanda's nails, and in a colorful pattern on one of her windows. In a parking lot, Bert meets with Heston, who he has hired to kill Lynn so he can collect life insurance. Heston successfully badgers Bert into giving him more money, due to the complications caused by Shivers and the police. Bert visits Shivers, who is revealed to be Doug Richardson, a former patient of his, a sex offender with Leber's congenital amaurosis. Worried that Shivers will wreck his plans, Bert orders him to leave Lynn alone.

Ignoring Bert, Shivers sends a party clown to Lynn's house to distract the guard, whom he beheads, spotting Heston nearby as he does so. When Shivers leaves, Heston breaks into Lynn's home, and is shot with his own gun during a struggle with Lynn and Tuck, who had stopped by to check on Lynn. At the Tokyo residence, Shivers murders Bert, due to Bert trying to have Heston assassinate Lynn, and thus almost ruining Shivers's chance to be "cured". While the authorities are content with believing that Heston was Shivers, Lynn is unconvinced. Nevertheless, she decides to go out on a date to a theatre with Tuck to celebrate being paid $100,000 for the painting she was hired to do.

Shivers continues his mission of trying to rid himself of his schizophrenia through Lynn. He kills her boss, abducts Nicholas after dismembering his babysitter, and breaks into the theatre, where he butchers two employees. As Shivers pursues Lynn and Tuck, Detective Peters races to the theatre, having gotten an alert about a 911 call from it, and news that the DNA under Amanda's fingernails matches Doug. Shivers uses Nicholas to lure Lynn out, and as the clown is about to kill her, Tuck blinds him from a projectionist booth, incapacitating him long enough for Peters and other officers to arrive, and arrest him.

Lynn goes home, and has a nightmare about Shivers escaping from prison, and attacking her and Nicholas.

Cast 

 Rick Ganz as Tucker Reid
 Jacqueline Reres as Lynn Blodgett
 Mark Lassise as Doug Richardson/Shivers the Clown
 Carl Randolph as Doctor Bert Tokyo
 Frank Lama as Detective Peters
 Ted Taylor as Heston
 John Patrick Barry as Officer Patrick
 Andrew Schneider as Phillip
 Lauren Pellegrino as Amanda Green
 Lisa Willis Brush as Julie
 Christopher Lee Philips as Osbourne
 Judith Furlow as Gale Wroten
 Patrick T. McGowan as Endle Parrish
 Jack-Joseph Porter as Nicholas Blodgett
 Darla Albornoz as Mediator
 Steven Gleich as Marty
 Jed Duvall as Happy Clown
 Rich Herard as Black Cop
 Ronald Lee Ward, Jr. as Paramedic
 Rich Henn as Cop #3
 James Fellows as Bobby
 Jeff Volpe as Jeff
 Bill Stull as Veteran Cop
 Jeremy Cavey as Young Cop
 Samantha Koehler as Young Lynn Blodgett
 Steve Carson as Cop with Children
 Kevin Kangas as Cop Who Ate Too Many Doughnuts

Production

Release

The film made its DVD debut on Feb 28, 2006 where it was released by Live/Artisan.

Reception 
Critical reception for the film has been mixed to negative.

Dread Central gave Fear of Clowns a 2½ out 5, and said that while the villain was intimidating and the film had "a few ambitious twists and turns" it was marred by uneven and inconsistent writing, and poor direction, though the website ultimately admitted that "For horror fans, Fear of Clowns is definitely worth a look. The film hits its mark much more than it misses and all in all is a fun ride". A 2/5 was awarded by DVD Talk, which wrote, "Although it has a few tense moments and creatively creepy scenes, Fear of Clowns runs on way too long" and "There's some good stuff tucked away in the generally forgettable Fear of Clowns -- and I'll gladly admit that it's a marked improvement over Hunting Humans -- but it's just too dry and familiar a tale".

The same grade was given by Bloody Disgusting, which wrote that the film was unfocused and overlong, and the characters largely two-dimensional, despite the solid performances of Jacky Reres and Mark Lassise as Lynn and Shivers, respectively. Arrow in the Head's Andre Manseau bestowed a score of 3½ out of 5, and summed up his feelings towards Fear of Clowns by calling it "a decent low budget slasher". Ain't It Cool News responded well to Fear of Clowns and its sequel, concluding, "If you're patient enough to sit through some lulls and low fi rough edges, Kangas delivers some definite shivers with his Fear of Clowns series".

References

External links 

 
 
 
 Interview with Kevin Kangas at Icons of Fright.com
 

2004 films
American slasher films
Fictional clowns
Horror films about clowns
2004 drama films
2004 horror films
Films set in 2003
American serial killer films
American horror drama films
Halloween horror films
Films set in a theatre
American police detective films
American independent films
Films about fictional painters
Films set in Baltimore
Fictional portrayals of schizophrenia
2000s English-language films
Films directed by Kevin Kangas
2000s American films